Dolichoneon is a monotypic genus of  jumping spiders containing the single species, Dolichoneon typicus. It was first described by Lodovico di Caporiacco in 1935, and is only found in Karakorum. Its taxonomic relationships within the family Salticidae are uncertain.

References

Monotypic Salticidae genera
Salticidae
Spiders of Asia